Carolyn Scott-Hamilton (also known as Carolyn Scott is a Colombian-born, bilingual TV show host and media personality, holistic nutritionist, vegan chef, cookbook author, and speaker.

Scott-Hamilton launched The Healthy Voyager travel show in 2006, which was followed by the launch of her online magazine, HealthyVoyager.com, as well as a number of other products, services and shows, including her cooking show, The Healthy Voyager's Global Kitchen. She is a double major graduate of the University of Miami and received her master's degree in Holistic Nutrition from Clayton College. She also holds various culinary certifications.

Scott-Hamilton was featured on the Discovery Channel and has appeared on The Better Show, Hallmark Home & Family, CNN, HLN, Daytime, EXTRA TV, the Ricki Lake Show, NBC affiliates, and many other national shows. In 2011, Scott-Hamilton published her first bestselling cookbook, entitled The Healthy Voyager's Global Kitchen. In 2013, she developed vegan and gluten free dishes for Knott's Berry Farm theme park in Buena Park, California. Her second cookbook, the 10-year anniversary of The Healthy Voyager's Global Kitchen: 175 Plant-Based Recipes from Across the Globe was published in December 2021.

Her award-winning travel show, The Healthy Voyager, has been syndicated around the world online on a wide variety of digital channels such as MSN Travel, Yahoo Travel, AOL On, Tastemade, Cooking Channel and any others. The show has won many accolades and awards such as several Taste Awards and collaborations with major brands, celebrities and even notable figures such as Richard Branson.

References

External links 
 HealthyVoyager.com
 CarolynScottHamilton.com

Year of birth missing (living people)
Living people
21st-century American women
American chefs
American cookbook writers
American nutritionists
American veganism activists
American women non-fiction writers
American women nutritionists
Chefs of vegan cuisine
Plant-based diet advocates
University of Miami alumni
Women cookbook writers
Writers from Los Angeles